The Aviation Environment Federation (AEF) is the principal UK non-profit making organisation concerned with the environmental effects of aviation.  These range from aviation noise issues associated with small airstrips or helipads to the contribution of airline emissions to global warming and climate change. The AEF is widely quoted in international media as a source of research and analysis on issues related to aviation and the environment.

The AEF was established in 1975 and its members include community and environmental groups, local authorities, parish councils, and individuals.

AEF is a member of AirportWatch, a UK-wide network of conservation and residents' groups, Transport and Environment, which campaigns for smarter, greener transport in Europe, and the International Coalition for Sustainable Aviation.

See also
AirportWatch
Aviation noise
Climate Change
Environmental impact of aviation
Global warming
Hypermobility (transport)
Natural environment
List of airports in the United Kingdom

References

External links

AirportWatch
GreenSkies Alliance

Aviation organisations based in the United Kingdom
Environmental organisations based in the United Kingdom
Organisations based in the City of London
1975 establishments in the United Kingdom
Organizations established in 1975